The Buffalo Bandits are a lacrosse team based in Buffalo, New York, playing in the National Lacrosse League (NLL). The 2012 season was their twenty-first season in the NLL.

Standings

Game log
Reference:

Playoffs

Game log
Reference:

Transactions

Trades

Dispersal draft
The Bandits chose the following players in the Boston Blazers dispersal draft:

Entry draft
The 2011 NLL Entry Draft took place on September 21, 2011. The Bandits selected the following players:

Roster

See also
2012 NLL season

References

Buffalo
Buffalo Bandits seasons
Buffalo Bandits